The Thomas W. Talbot Monument is a public monument dedicated to Thomas W. Talbot in Atlanta, Georgia, United States. Located in Grant Park, the monument was dedicated in 1948 to Talbot, who had founded what is now the International Association of Machinists and Aerospace Workers in the city in 1888.

History 
On May 5, 1888, railroad machinist Thomas W. Talbot, along with 18 other machinists, organized a labor union that would later become known as the International Association of Machinists and Aerospace Workers (IAM) in Atlanta, Georgia. Talbot would die several years later in 1892. In May 1948, on the 60th anniversary of the founding of the union, the union dedicated this monument to their founder. The statue was dedicated on May 5 of that year, in a dedication ceremony attended by a grandson and great grandson of Talbot's, with then-IAM president Harvey W. Brown giving a dedication speech. Over 1,500 IAM members attended the anniversary celebrations in Atlanta. The location for the monument, Grant Park, was chosen due to its prominence in the city, and today the area is a plaza near an entrance for Zoo Atlanta.

In 2013, to celebrate the union's 125th anniversary, a new plaque was dedicated for the statue. The IAM local from Marietta, Georgia hosted the event.

Design 
The monument consists of a bronze bust of Talbot resting atop a pedestal made of Tennessee marble. Attached to the pedestal is a bronze logo of the IAM and a plaque that reads:

The 2013 plaque attached to the statue reads:

See also 

 1948 in art

References

External links 

1948 establishments in Georgia (U.S. state)
1948 sculptures
Bronze sculptures in Georgia (U.S. state)
Buildings and structures completed in 1948
Buildings and structures in Atlanta
International Association of Machinists and Aerospace Workers
Landmarks in Atlanta
Marble sculptures in Georgia (U.S. state)
Monuments and memorials in Georgia (U.S. state)
Outdoor sculptures in Georgia (U.S. state)
Sculptures of men in the United States